John Atherton (1598 – 5 December 1640) was the Anglican Bishop of Waterford and Lismore in the Church of Ireland. He and John Childe (his steward and tithe proctor) were both tried and executed for buggery in 1640.

Life and death

Early life and education 
Atherton was born in 1598 in Somerset, England. His father, also named John was a parson and Rector of Bawdrip. He studied at Oxford University and joined the ranks of the Anglican clergy, serving as Rector of Huish Champflower.

Career in the Anglican clergy 
In 1630, he became prebendary of the Church of St. John the Evangelist in Dublin, in addition, Chancellor of the Anglican Diocese of Killaloe. In 1634, chancellor of Christ Church Cathedral and rector of Killaban and Ballintubride in 1635.

In 1636, under the patronage of the Lord Lieutenant of Ireland Thomas Wentworth, 1st Earl of Strafford, he became Bishop of Waterford and Lismore in the Church of Ireland under the protests of the Roman Catholic majority in his see.

After the Buggery Act 1533 was found in 1631, during the Mervyn Tuchet, 2nd Earl of Castlehaven case, to not apply to Ireland, Atherton pushed for the enactment of "An Act for the Punishment for the Vice Of Buggery" in 1634.

Downfall 
In 1640 Atherton was accused of buggery with a man, John Childe, his steward and tithe proctor. Even though his fellow clerics attempted to prevent his trial to save the reputation of his Church, they were the first to have been tried under the law that Atherton himself had helped to institute.

They were found guilty and both condemned to death, to the applause of the crowd, with Atherton being nearly lynched on his way to prison at Cork.

Nicholas Bernard, Dean of Elphin and Ardagh, acted as his spiritual counselor and wrote an account of Atherton’s final days. Atherton was executed by hanging in Stephen's Green, Dublin, after reading the morning service for his cellmates. Reportedly, he confessed about the crime to the priest ministering him immediately before his execution, although he had proclaimed his innocence before that and kept doing so during the execution.

Legacy

Character assassination and conspiracy 
Since 1710, some historical evidence has been developed that shows Atherton might have been a victim of a conspiracy to discredit him and his patrons. This was attributable to Atherton's status as an astute lawyer, who sought to recover lost land for the relatively weak Protestant Church of Ireland during the 1630s. Unfortunately for Atherton, this alienated him from large landowners, who then allegedly used his sexuality to discredit him. The conspiracy has been alleged to have been led by a lawyer named Butler, over land in Killoges, near Waterfeld. Butler became insane after the execution, claiming to see Atherton at all time.

English Puritan, Congregationalist and Independent activists, as well as English and Scottish Presbyterian activists, contemporaneously campaigned to abolish Episcopacy (bishops) within the embattled Church of England, Church of Scotland and Church of Ireland; notionally expediting the political interest in Atherton's downfall.

Posthumous accusations of sexual wrongdoing also include allegations of "incest" with his sister-in-law, and infanticide of the resultant child, as well as zoophilia with cattle. However, these allegations began to be circulated several months after his death in an anonymous pamphlet, and may have been intended to further discredit the bishop's campaign to restore the finances of the Church of Ireland.

Legends 
A legend had him linked to the Old Mother Leakey, a Somerset ghost accused of shipwrecking.

Another legend describes the house of Butler, the lawyer who allegedly led the conspiracy against Atherton, as being haunted by the ghost of the bishop.

See also

 List of people executed for homosexuality

References

Further reading
 
 
 
 
 
 
 

1598 births
1640 deaths
17th-century LGBT people
Alumni of the University of Oxford
Bishops of Waterford and Lismore (Church of Ireland)
Executed people from Somerset
LGBT Anglican clergy
People executed by the Kingdom of Ireland by hanging
People executed for sodomy